Liselotte of the Palatinate is a 1966 West German historical comedy film directed by Kurt Hoffmann and starring Heidelinde Weis, Harald Leipnitz and Karin Hübner. It portrays the marriage of the German princess Liselotte of the Palatinate to Philippe I, Duc d'Orléans the brother of Louis XIV and her adventures at the French court.

An earlier film about her life starring Renate Müller was released in 1935.

It was shot at the Spandau Studios in Berlin, Charlottenburg Palace and on location in Munich and Czechoslovakia. The film's sets were designed by the art director Otto Pischinger.

Cast

References

Bibliography

External links 
 

1966 films
1960s historical comedy films
German historical comedy films
West German films
1960s German-language films
Films directed by Kurt Hoffmann
Films set in Paris
Films set in the 1670s
Constantin Film films
1966 comedy films
Films shot at Spandau Studios
1960s German films